James or Jim Parks may refer to:
 James Parks (freed slave) (1843–1929), freed slave prominently buried in Arlington National Cemetery
 James Parks (actor) (born 1968), American actor
 James C. Parks (1942–2002), American botanist and plant taxonomist
 Jim Parks (cricketer, born 1931) (1931–2022), the son, a batsman who became a wicket keeper
 Jim Parks (cricketer, born 1903) (1903–1980), the father, an all-rounder

See also
 James Park (disambiguation)
 James Parkes (disambiguation)
 James Parke (disambiguation)